"" (Praise the Lord, all peoples) is a round for three parts to a German text based on three psalms. The melody has been passed orally. The round, a general expression of praise, is part of many hymnals and songbooks, and used for many occasions. It is easy and also suitable for children and young adults.

History 
The text of "" is a call to praise the Lord, be glad in him and serve him, as expressed in several psalms verses, such as Psalm 117:1, Psalm 100:2 and Psalm 67:4–6. The round is for three parts, with a simple melody passed orally. It is a psalm song of general praise, sung instead of a psalm, and for general reasons of praise. The melody is easy, with the second line in third-parallels to the first, and the third line being a bass foundation. It has been recommended as suitable for services with children, and movements have been designed to be used in groups of children. It is also listed in collections for young adults.

The round is part of many hymnals and songbooks. In the common Protestant hymnal in German, Evangelisches Gesangbuch, it is EG 337, and in its Catholic counterpart, Gotteslob, it was GL 282 in the first edition and 408 in the second edition.

Music 
The music is commonly written in F major; it is in a triple metre.

It begins with the highest note, which eases the beginning. The first two lines move mostly in steady rhythm, with a dotted note at the beginning of the second measure. The last note holds the key note for all measures except the third which repeats the dominant C.

Bärenreiter published a setting for band, as for other songs from Gotteslob.

References

External links 
 Evangelisches Gesangbuch 337 l4a.org

Christian songs
Rounds (music)